Oughtibridge War Memorial Women Football Club is an English women's football club based in Oughtibridge, Sheffield, South Yorkshire.

History

Season by season record

References

External links
Official site

Women's football clubs in England
Football clubs in South Yorkshire
Sheffield & Hallamshire County FA members
Sports teams and clubs in Sheffield
Oughtibridge